Dido (minor planet designation: 209 Dido) is a main-belt asteroid with a diameter of . It was discovered by C. H. F. Peters on October 22, 1879, in Clinton, New York and was named after the mythical Carthaginian queen Dido. The orbital plane is tilted at an angle of 7.2° to the plane of the ecliptic.

209 Dido is classified as a C-type asteroid and is probably composed of  carbonaceous materials. Like many asteroids of its type, it has an extremely low albedo. The pole orientation in ecliptic coordinates, as determined from multiple light curve studies, is (βp, λp) =.

References

External links 
 Lightcurve plot of 209 Dido, Palmer Divide Observatory, B. D. Warner (2005)
 Asteroid Lightcurve Database (LCDB), query form (info )
 Dictionary of Minor Planet Names, Google books
 Asteroids and comets rotation curves, CdR – Observatoire de Genève, Raoul Behrend
 Discovery Circumstances: Numbered Minor Planets (1)-(5000) – Minor Planet Center
 
 

Background asteroids
Dido
Dido
C-type asteroids (Tholen)
Xc-type asteroids (SMASS)
18791022